Qore (pronounced "core") was a monthly subscription-based interactive online magazine for the PlayStation Network and replaces the Jampack series of disks offered by PlayStation Underground. Available only in North America, the service offered high definition videos, interviews, and behind-the-scenes footage pertaining to upcoming and recently released PlayStation games. It also offered exclusive access to game demos and betas. The product was available to download to the PlayStation 3 from the PlayStation Store, where users were able to choose to purchase individual episodes or an annual, 13-episode subscription. PlayStation Plus subscribers received Qore free of charge for the duration of their subscription. The magazine was presented by Veronica Belmont & Audrey Cleo and later Jesse 'Blaze' Snider & Tiffany Smith.

Qore aired its 47th and final episode on April 10, 2012.

History
On June 3, 2008, Sony announced a new service, Qore, which launched on the PlayStation Store in North America on June 6, 2008. In the press release published on the Official PlayStation Blog, Qore: Presented by the PlayStation Network was described as "a highly interactive, monthly lifestyle gaming program covering the world inside PlayStation".

Service

Game videos
Each episode included a selection of behind-the-scenes videos, previews, interviews and news related to PlayStation products. Videos were presented in 720p. Each episode contains between 25 and 30 minutes of video content, not including advertisements, the opening trailer, or introduction videos.

Download center
People who purchased a one-year subscription to Qore gained access to exclusive playable and downloadable PSone games, demos, betas, and themes. All content was to be downloaded through the PlayStation Network while signed in through Qore's Download Center.

Access
Once purchased, Qore programs became available on the PlayStation Store's Download List. If an annual subscription was purchased, episodes were automatically added to the user's Download List. Redeemable codes for Qore episodes have also been included free with each issue of the PlayStation Magazine.

Notable Content
 June 2008, Episode 1 - SOCOM U.S. Navy SEALs: Confrontation beta invitation
 July 2008, Episode 2 - Naruto: Ultimate Ninja Storm demo early access
 August 2008, Episode 3 - Resistance 2 beta invitation
 September 2008, Episode 4 - MotorStorm: Pacific Rift demo early access
 October 2008, Episode 5 - Valkyria Chronicles demo early access
 November 2008, Episode 6 - PlayStation Home closed beta invitation for annual subscribers
 December 2008, Episode 7, Free episode - Flock! demo early access for annual subscribers
 January 2009, Episode 8 - F.E.A.R. 2: Project Origin demo early access
 February 2009, Episode 9 - Syphon Filter PS1 classic voucher
 March 2009, Episode 10 - High Velocity Bowling full PSN game voucher for annual subscribers
 April 2009, Episode 11, Free episode - Linger in Shadows voucher and Red Faction: Guerrilla demo early access for annual subscribers
 May  2009, Episode 12 - Uncharted 2: Among Thieves beta invitation for annual subscribers
 June 2009, Episode 13 - Spyro the Dragon PS1 classic voucher
 July 2009, Episode 14 - Battlefield 1943 theme for all purchasers
 August 2009, Episode 15 - High Velocity Bowling PSN game voucher & Ninja Gaiden Sigma 2 theme for annual subscribers
 September 2009, Episode 16 - MAG beta invitation for annual subscribers
 December 2009, Episode 19 - ModNation Racers Beta invitation for annual subscribers
May 2010, Episode 42 - LittleBigPlanet Cap

Access
FirstPlay (previously known as Official PlayStation Magazine HD or OPMHD) was an electronic magazine similar to Qore, produced by Future Publishing. Released in April 2010, it is available to PlayStation 3 users via the PlayStation Store in the UK. Like Qore, FirstPlay offered exclusive videos, demos and downloads. but is released weekly instead of monthly. In July 2011 SCEE announced that the FirstPlay service was to end, leaving the 6th July episode as the final FirstPlay to be released. The announcement went on to confirm that a new, then yet-to-be-named service would replace FirstPlay, its focus shifting to SCEE's PlayStation Access events. Access is produced by Future Publishing and delivered via the PSN Store, however unlike its predecessor, is free of charge.

Criticism
The announcement that Qore subscribers will have advanced access to exclusive betas and demos has triggered a mixed reaction from the gaming community. Many users believe this is a covert way of introducing a premium PlayStation Network subscription model, similar to that used on Microsoft's Xbox Live Marketplace service where premium subscribers get game demos one week before they are fully released. Criticism has also been made of the way that advertising is being incorporated into the service.

Gaming commentators have also attacked Qore for being light on content, and for containing too many advertisements (two 20-second spots that can be skipped after the first 5 seconds, and one 15 second spot in the "download section" which cannot be skipped by the viewer). Critics have said that because Qore is a paid-for, premium service, it should not contain so many "intrusive" adverts.

References

External links
Official press release and demonstration video
Official Qore Website

Online video game services
Network
PlayStation Network
PlayStation Store
Video on demand
PlayStation (brand) magazines
Magazines established in 2008
Magazines disestablished in 2012
Defunct computer magazines published in the United States